Charles Wooldridge West (19 May 1884 – 16 February 1962) was an Australian rules footballer who played with South Melbourne in the Victorian Football League (VFL).

Notes

External links 

1884 births
1962 deaths
Australian rules footballers from Victoria (Australia)
Sydney Swans players